Alexander Mills Lane (1857–1911) was an American physician and politician. He was a member of the Illinois House of Representatives, serving as a Republican, for two terms from 1906 until 1910. He also served as the assistant physician of Cook County, Illinois for six years, from 1905 until his death in 1911.

Early life and education

Alexander Lane was born in 1857 in Lexington, Mississippi. He moved to Tamaroa, Illinois at age eight. He attended local public schools and after high school, entered Southern Illinois University Carbondale.

After graduating, he became a school principal at segregated school for Black children in Carbondale, Illinois. He served as principal for ten years. On September 12, 1882, he married Isabelle Holland. They had one child, a boy named Roscoe.

In 1891, he moved to Chicago and began studying medicine at Rush Medical College. He graduated from Rush with a medical degree in 1895.

Career and life

In 1905, he was named assistant Cook County physician. He retained this position during his time in politics.

Politics

He served two terms in the Illinois House of Representatives. He was elected in 1906 and 1908.

Later life and death

Lane became sick in early 1911 and his family convinced him to retire from his position as assistant physician of Cook County. Starting in July 2011, he was confined to his house due to his illness. Lane died on November 12, 1911 at his home in Chicago. His funeral services were held at his home on the Near South Side. The funeral was held in the African Methodist Episcopal Church tradition. He was buried at Oakland Cemetery in Carbondale.

Further reading
Smoot, Pamela A. From Slavery to Freedom: The Life of Alexander Lane, Educator, Physician, and Illinois State Legislator, 1860-1911. Carbondale: Southern Illinois University (2012).

References

External links

1857 births
1911 deaths
People from Lexington, Mississippi
Politicians from Chicago
People from Carbondale, Illinois
Rush Medical College alumni
African-American state legislators in Illinois
Republican Party members of the Illinois House of Representatives
African-American men in politics
People from Perry County, Illinois
Southern Illinois University Carbondale alumni
American school principals
19th-century American physicians
20th-century African-American physicians
20th-century American physicians
20th-century African-American politicians
20th-century American politicians
Physicians from Chicago
African-American Methodists
Burials in Illinois